Pierre Trentin (born 15 May 1944) is a retired French cyclist who was active between 1961 and 1984. He was most successful in sprint track events, in which he won two gold and two bronze Olympic medals, as well as 11 medals at world championships. His only road title was junior champion of France in 1961. He won most of his tandem titles with Daniel Morelon, who was also his major rival in the individual sprint races.

In the semi-final of the 1,000 metres sprint at the Tokyo Olympic Games, Trentin and Giovanni Pettenella set an Olympic record for standing still - 21 minutes and 57 seconds.

References

External links
Great Olympians – biographies

1944 births
Living people
French male cyclists
Cyclists at the 1964 Summer Olympics
Cyclists at the 1968 Summer Olympics
Cyclists at the 1972 Summer Olympics
Cyclists at the 1976 Summer Olympics
Olympic cyclists of France
Olympic gold medalists for France
Olympic bronze medalists for France
Olympic medalists in cycling
Sportspeople from Créteil
Medalists at the 1964 Summer Olympics
Medalists at the 1968 Summer Olympics
French track cyclists
Cyclists from Île-de-France